Firesteel River may refer to:
 Firesteel River (British Columbia), Canada
 Firesteel River (Ontario), Canada
 Firesteel River (Michigan), United States